Fanling is a station on the  of the Hong Kong MTR. It is next to Fanling Town Centre, and is only a short walk away from Fung Ying Seen Koon, a well-known Taoist temple. The Fanling Highway was built from 1983 to 1987 directly adjacent to the station. The station is located on Fanling Station Road within the Fanling area in North District, New Territories, Hong Kong.

History 
Fanling station opened in the same time as the Kowloon–Canton Railway British Section on 1 October 1910.

The station once served as the terminus of the Sha Tau Kok Railway, which ceased operations on 1 April 1928. The Wo Hop Shek branch line was taken out of service in 1983 after electrification along the KCR. Full line of electrification was completed on 15 July 1983.

Layout

Exits 
Concourse
 A: Fanling Town Centre
 A1: San Wan Road 
 A2: Fanling Station Road
 A3: Public light bus terminus and taxi stand
 B: Fanling South (Pak Wo Road) 

Platform 2
 C: Fanling Town Centre, public light bus terminus and taxi stand

References

External links 

Hong Kong Railway Information Centre

MTR stations in the New Territories
East Rail line
Former Kowloon–Canton Railway stations
Railway stations in Hong Kong opened in 1910
Fanling